Shawn Parker (born 7 March 1993) is a German professional footballer who plays as a forward.

Club career

Mainz 05
Parker made his Bundesliga debut on 27 October 2012 as a late substitute against Hoffenheim. He scored four goals in 27 league appearances for Mainz.

FC Augsburg
On 1 July 2014, Parker transferred to Bundesliga club FC Augsburg and signed a four-year deal.

Greuther Fürth
In August 2018, Parker joined 2. Bundesliga side SpVgg Greuther Fürth having agreed a two-year deal with the club.

On 31 January 2020, the last day of the 2019–20 winter transfer period, he agreed the termination of his contract with Greuther Fürth.

International career
Parker has appeared for Germany at the under-15, under-16, under-17, under-18, under-19, under-20, and under-21 levels but still remains eligible for the United States due to having an American father. In 2012, it was revealed that United States manager Jürgen Klinsmann had spoken to Parker about representing the United States in the future. Speaking on his international preference, Parker said, "It is a hard decision to make of course. One should be very proud to play for the country your father is from. I am playing for Germany now and this is my home base. Both sides are very interesting. I like Germany now, but I won’t rule out that I will play for the United States in the future."

Personal life
Parker was born in Wiesbaden to a German mother and an African American serviceman father, who settled in Germany after serving in the military. Parker briefly lived in Virginia in the U.S. before moving back to Germany. He has two younger brothers, Devante and Jermaine, who are part of the Mainz 05 youth teams.

Career statistics

Club

References

External links
 

1993 births
Living people
German people of American descent
German people of African-American descent
Sportspeople from Wiesbaden
Association football forwards
German footballers
Bundesliga players
2. Bundesliga players
1. FSV Mainz 05 players
1. FSV Mainz 05 II players
FC Augsburg players
1. FC Nürnberg players
SpVgg Greuther Fürth players
Germany youth international footballers
Germany under-21 international footballers
Footballers from Hesse